Rodda's is a dairy company in Scorrier, Cornwall, United Kingdom, known for clotted cream. It is the world's largest producer of clotted cream.  Since 2009 the company has awarded the Rodda's Cup to the winners of the Camborne and Redruth bi-annual fixture, with games between the sides being the rugby union world's longest continuous rugby fixture.

References

External links

Dairy products companies of the United Kingdom
Companies based in Cornwall
British companies established in 1890
Food and drink companies established in 1890